Rod Frawley and Francisco González were the defending champions but they lost in the first round to Peter McNamara and Paul McNamee.

Peter Fleming and John McEnroe won in the final 4–6, 6–1, 6–2 against Tim Gullikson and Johan Kriek.

Seeds

  Peter Fleming /  John McEnroe (champions)
  Gene Mayer /  Sandy Mayer (semifinals)
  Peter McNamara /  Paul McNamee (quarterfinals)
  Tom Gullikson /  Butch Walts (quarterfinals)

Draw

External links
1980 Custom Credit Australian Indoor Championships Doubles Draw

Doubles